NGC 7217 is an unbarred spiral galaxy in the constellation Pegasus.

Features 
NGC 7217 is a gas-poor system whose main features are the presence of several rings of stars concentric to its nucleus: three main ones –the outermost one being of the most prominent and the one that features most of the gas and star formation of this galaxy – plus several others inside the innermost one discovered with the help of the Hubble Space Telescope; a feature that suggests NGC 7217's central regions have suffered several starbursts. There is also a very large and massive spheroid that extends beyond its disk.

Other noteworthy features this galaxy has are the presence of a number of stars rotating in the opposite direction around the galaxy's center to most of them and two distinct stellar populations: one of intermediate age on its innermost regions and a younger, metal-poor version  on its outermost ones.

It has been suggested these features were caused by a merger with another galaxy and, in fact, computer simulations show that NGC 7217 could have been a large lenticular galaxy that merged with one or two smaller gas-rich ones of late Hubble type becoming the spiral galaxy we see today; however right now this galaxy is isolated in space, with no nearby major companions. More recent research, however, presents a somewhat different scenario in which NGC 7217's massive bulge and halo would have been formed in a merger and the disk formed later (and is still growing) either accreting gas from the intergalactic medium or smaller gas-rich galaxies, or most likely from a previously existing reserve.

See also
 Spiral Galaxy NGC 1512
 NGC 7742, a very similar galaxy in the same constellation

References

External links

 NGC 7217 
 http://atlas.zevallos.com.br/
 

Unbarred spiral galaxies
Ring galaxies
Pegasus (constellation)
7217
11914
68096